Dahegaon is a village and a mandal in Komaram Bheem district of Telangana state, India. It comes under Kagaznagar Revenue division.

Geography 
Kagaznagar, Bellampalle, Mandamarri and Mancherial are the nearby towns to Dahegaon. Dahegaon Mandal is surrounded by Bheemini Mandal towards west, Vemanpally Mandal towards south, Bejjur Mandal towards North and Nennel Mandal towards south.

Villages in Dahegaon mandal 

 Gorregutta    
 Borlakunta
 Kothmir
 Beebra
 Pesarkunta
 Ainam            
 Polampalle
 Hathni
 Kalwada
 Dahegaon
 Pambapur
 Kammarpalle
 Laggaon
 Bhogaram
 Vodduguda
 Brahmanchichal
 Bhamanagar
 Kunchavelli
 Chandrapalle
 Etapalle
 Girvelli
 Chinnaraspalle
 Amargonda
 Loha
 Digida
 Teepergaon
 Rampur
 Dubbaguda
 Itial
 Motlaguda
 Ravalpalle

References 

te:దహేగావ్

Mandals in Telangana
Villages in Komaram Bheem district
Mandals in Komaram Bheem district